The Prisoner of Zenda is a 1915 British silent adventure film directed by George Loane Tucker and starring Henry Ainley, Jane Gail and Gerald Ames. Shot at Twickenham Studios, it is an adaptation of 1894 novel The Prisoner of Zenda by Anthony Hope. A film based on the 1898 sequel Rupert of Hentzau was released shortly afterwards with the same director and cast.

Plot summary

Cast
 Henry Ainley as Rudolf Rasendyll / Rudolf V 
 Jane Gail as Princess Flavia 
 Gerald Ames as Rupert of Hentzau 
 Arthur Holmes-Gore as Michael, Duke of Strelsau 
 Charles Rock as Colonel Sapt 
 George Bellamy as Captain von Rischenheim 
 Norman Yates as Fritz von Tarlenheim 
 Marie Anita Bozzi as Antoinette de Mauban

References

Bibliography
 Goble, Alan. The Complete Index to Literary Sources in Film. Walter de Gruyter, 1999.
 Low, Rachael. The History of British Film, Volume III: 1914-1918. Routledge, 1997.

External links
 
 

1915 films
1915 adventure films
British adventure films
British silent feature films
1910s English-language films
Films directed by George Loane Tucker
British black-and-white films
Films based on British novels
Films shot at Twickenham Film Studios
Films set in Europe
Films based on The Prisoner of Zenda
Silent adventure films
1910s British films